The British Association for American Studies is a learned society in the field of American studies. It was founded in 1955. It produces the Journal of American Studies, American Studies in Britain, US Studies Online, BAAS Paperbacks, and Resources for American Studies.

It has produced many of its own publications, as well as many in partnership with Cambridge University Press, Edinburgh University Press, and Microform Academic Publishers.

BAAS Chairs past and present

Frank Thistlethwaite 1955–59
Herbert Nicholas 1959–62
Marcus Cunliffe 1962–65
Esmond Wright 1965–68
Maldwyn Jones 1968–71
George Shepperson 1971–74
Harry Allen 1974–77
Peter Parish 1977–80
Dennis Welland 1980–83
Charlotte Erickson 1983–86
Howard Temperley 1986–89
Bob Burchell 1989–92
Richard King 1992–95
Judie Newman 1995–98
Philip Davies 1998–2004
Simon Newman 2004–2007
Heidi Macpherson 2007–2010
Martin Halliwell 2010–2013
Susan Currell 2013–2016
Brian Ward 2016–2019
Cara Rodway 2019–

See also 
American studies in the United Kingdom

External links
 

Organizations established in 1955
American studies
Learned societies of the United Kingdom
1955 establishments in the United Kingdom
Social sciences organizations